is a group of Kofun period burial mounds located in the cities of Fujiidera and Habikino, Osaka Prefecture, Japan. Twelve of the tumuli in this group were individually designated a National Historic Site of Japan in 1956, within additional 14 collectively added to the designation in 2001, and the area under protection expanded in 2018.

Overview
The Furuichi Kofun Cluster extends over an area of 2.5 kilometers north-to-south by four kilometers east-to-west, covering plateaus and hill with an average elevation of 24 meters above sea level. These tumuli were built between the late 4th and the mid-sixth century AD. Twenty-seven, including many of the larger tumuli, are under the control of the Imperial Household Agency and are classified as "imperial tombs", for which archaeological excavation has been prohibited.

In 2010 the Furuichi kofungun cluster of tumuli, along with those of Mozu kofungun, were proposed for inscription on the UNESCO World Heritage List. On 6 July 2019, Mozu-Furuichi Kofun Group was inscribed as a UNESCO World Heritage Site under Criteria: (iii), (iv).

Types 
 ("keyhole-shaped) : formerly 31, 26 survive
 ("circular"): formerly 30, 5 survive
 ("square"): formerly 48, 22 survive
indeterminate: formerly 14, 34 survive

Total: formerly 123, 87 survive

Gallery 

The Mozu kofungun is located about 10 kilometers to the west. It can be said that it was. The Furuichi Kofun group is seven to fifteen minutes on foot from Domyoji Station or Furuichi Station on the Kintetsu Railway.

See also
 Kofun
 Mozu kofungun
List of Historic Sites of Japan (Osaka)
 List of National Treasures of Japan (archaeological materials)
 Buried Cultural Properties
 World Heritage Sites in Japan

References

External links

  Entry on UNESCO World Heritage tentative list

Kofun
Buildings and structures in Osaka Prefecture
Tourist attractions in Osaka Prefecture
History of Osaka Prefecture
Historic Sites of Japan
World Heritage Sites in Japan
Habikino
Fujiidera